Arndilly House is a 1770 house in Banffshire, Scotland, in the parish of Boharm. It lies between the River Spey and Ben Aigan.

It was remodelled in both 1826 and 1850.

It is a category A listed building with Historic Scotland.

It was remodelled in the Scots baronial style in 1850 by the Aberdeen architect James Matthews.

It was the seat of the MacDowall Grant family in the 18th and 19th centuries, including David McDowall-Grant.

References

External links
Official website
Rightmove.co.uk

Category A listed buildings in Moray
Banffshire